Christopher James Miller (born August 9, 1965) is an American football coach and former quarterback who was selected by the Atlanta Falcons in the 1st round (13th overall) of the 1987 NFL Draft. He played college football at the University of Oregon.

Early life
Born in Pomona, California, Miller was raised in Oregon. He attended Sheldon High School in Eugene, Oregon. He was star athlete in three sports: baseball, football and basketball.

College athlete
Miller attended University of Oregon where he played quarterback for the Oregon Ducks football team. He was considered a risky recruit for higher ranked college teams due to concerns about a knee injury he suffered in high school.

College statistics
1983: 17/41 for 229 yards with 2 TD vs 3 INT
1984: 145/289 for 1,712 yards with 10 TD vs 10 INT
1985: 182/329 for 2,237 yards with 18 TD vs 13 INT; 45 carries for 81 yards with 4 TD
1986: 216/356 for 2,503 yards with 12 TD vs 13 INT

Professional athlete
Miller played in 10 NFL seasons from 1987 to 1995 and 1999. His best year as a pro came during the 1991 season for the Falcons when he threw for over 3,000 yards and 26 touchdowns.

Concussions prevented him from playing longer. After he suffered five in a span of 14 months, he left the league for the first time. A concussion during his comeback with the Denver Broncos in 1999 convinced him that it was best to retire for good. He was inducted into the Oregon Sports Hall of Fame in 2005.

Coaching career
Miller was the head coach for South Eugene High School in Eugene, Oregon, from 2001 to 2006. He was also the quarterback coach for the Arizona Cardinals from 2009 to 2011. In 2013, Miller returned to South Eugene as head coach. In 2014, he was named the head football coach at West Linn High School.

Before the 2019 season, Miller announced he would depart West Linn at year's end to join the Houston Roughnecks of the XFL as offensive coordinator.

In May 2020, he was named head coach of Franklin High School in Portland, Oregon.  He never coached a game for the Lightning, however, as his former position at West Linn opened up a few weeks later and Miller returned to the Lions on July 8, 2020.

References

1965 births
Living people
Sportspeople from Eugene, Oregon
Sportspeople from Pomona, California
Players of American football from Oregon
American football quarterbacks
Sheldon High School (Eugene, Oregon) alumni
Oregon Ducks football players
Atlanta Falcons players
Los Angeles Rams players
St. Louis Rams players
Denver Broncos players
National Conference Pro Bowl players
High school football coaches in Oregon
Houston Roughnecks coaches